This article outlines the events leading up to the 2014 Indian general election from 7 April to 12 May 2014, starting with the prior election in 2009.

Pre poll

2009–2012

2009 
 16 May: Result for 2009 general election are declared. Incumbent UPA government retains a majority in parliament.
 16 May: Result for Legislative Assembly elections declared.
 INC leader Y. S. Rajasekhara Reddy is elected as Chief Minister of Andhra Pradesh.
 BJD chairperson Naveen Patnaik is elected as Chief Minister of Odisha.
 SDF chairperson Pawan Kumar Chamling is elected as Chief Minister of Sikkim for an unprecedented fourth consecutive term.
 18 May: 14th Lok Sabha dissolved by the President with immediate effect.
 18 May: Manmohan Singh submits the resignation of his Council of Ministers to the President.
 22 May: Second government of Manmohan Singh sworn in.
 1 June: Inaugural session of 15th Lok Sabha.
 15 August: 62nd Independence Day celebrated.
 2 September: Y. S. Rajasekhara Reddy, the Chief Minister of Andhra Pradesh dies in a tragic helicopter crash.
 22 October: Result for Legislative Assembly elections declared.
 INC incumbent Dorjee Khandu is elected as Chief Minister of Arunachal Pradesh.
 INC incumbent Bhupinder Singh Hooda is elected as Chief Minister of Haryana.
 INC incumbent Ashok Chavan is elected as Chief Minister of Maharashtra.
 23 December: BJP, JD(U) and JMM strike a deal to form a government in Jharkhand after an election returned a hung assembly.

2010 
 26 January: Diamond Jubilee of Indian Republic. 60th Republic Day celebrated.
 12 March: India and Russia signs a nuclear reactor deal.
 1 April: The Right of Children to Free and Compulsory Education Act to provide free and compulsory education comes into force.
 3 October: XIX Commonwealth Games held in Delhi.
 24 November: BJP and JD(U) alliance wins election in Bihar. Incumbent Nitish Kumar is sworn in as Chief Minister of Bihar.
 30 December: Srikrishna Committee on Telangana submits its report to the Ministry of Home Affairs.

2011 
 2 February: Telecom Minister A. Raja sent to Tihar Jail in 2G spectrum case.
 5 April: Anna Hazare undertakes fast for Jan Lokpal Bill
 13 May: Result for Legislative Assembly elections declared.
 INC incumbent Tarun Gogoi is elected as Chief Minister of Assam.
 Oommen Chandy of UDF alliance is elected as Chief Minister of Kerala.
 N. Rangaswamy is elected as Chief Minister of Puducherry.
 AIADMK leader J. Jayalalithaa is elected as Chief Minister of Tamil Nadu.
 AITMC chairperson Mamata Banerjee is elected as Chief Minister of West Bengal defeating the longest serving democratically elected Communist government in the world after the 34-year rule of the Left Front government.

2012 
 6 March: Result for Legislative Assembly elections declared.
 BJP wins a majority in an election for legislative assembly of Goa. Manohar Parrikar is sworn in as Chief Minister.
 Election in Manipur returns incumbent Okram Ibobi Singh to be re-elected for the post of Chief Minister.
 SAD – BJP alliance led by Parkash Singh Badal wins elections in Punjab despite a traditional anti-incumbency.
 Elections in Uttarakhand leads to a hung assembly. Vijay Bahuguna of INC is sworn in as Chief Minister.
 Akhilesh Yadav, son of SP chairperson Mulayam Singh is sworn in as Chief Minister of Uttar Pradesh.
 22 July: Finance Minister Pranab Mukherjee is elected as the 13th president of the Republic.
 20 December: Result for Legislative Assembly elections declared.
 BJP leader Narendra Modi forms the state government in Gujarat for the fourth consecutive term in an election.
 INC leader Virbhadra Singh is elected as Chief Minister of Himachal Pradesh.

2013 
 February: Election to state assembly of Tripura returns CPI(M) leader Manik Sarkar as Chief Minister.
 An election in Meghalaya sees incumbent Mukul Sangma to be re-elected for the post of Chief Minister.
 NPF leader Neiphiu Rio is re-elected as Chief Minister in an election.
 8 May: Election to state assembly of Karnataka gives a majority to INC with Siddaramaiah being sworn in as Chief Minister.
 10 June: BJP leader Narendra Modi is declared as the head of poll campaign for the party.
 13 September: BJP leader and four time CM of Gujarat Narendra Modi is chosen as the Prime Ministerial candidate for the party.
 8 December: Result for Legislative Assembly elections declared.
 A high voltage election to state assembly of Delhi resulted in a hung assembly with BJP winning largest number of seats. The newcomer of Indian politics AAP formed the government with support of the INC.
 BJP wins a four-fifths majority in an election to state assembly of Rajasthan. Vasundhara Raje is sworn in as Chief Minister.
 BJP wins a third consecutive election in Madhya Pradesh. Shivraj Singh Chouhan is sworn in as Chief Minister.
 BJP wins a third consecutive an election in Chhattisgarh. Raman Singh is sworn in as Chief Minister.
 INC leader Pu Lalthanhawla is sworn in as Chief Minister of Mizoram in an election.

Electoral Events 
 5 March : The Election Commission of India announce election scheduled to the 16th Lok Sabha.
 5 March: the Model code of conduct comes into force.
 14 March: Issue of notification for the first poll day.
 15 March: Issue of notification for the second and third poll days.
 19 March: Issue of notification for the fourth and fifth poll days.
 21 March: Last Date for filing nominations for the first poll day.
 21 March: Last Date for filing nominations for the second and third poll days.
 21 March: Last Date for filing nominations for the fourth and fifth poll days.
 29 March: Issue of notification for the sixth poll day.
 2 April: Issue of notification for the seventh poll day.
 5 April: Last Date for filing nominations for the sixth poll day.
 7 April: Polling held at 6 parliamentary constituencies spanning over 2 states for the first poll day.
 7 April: the BJP release its election manifesto.
 9 April: Last Date for filing nominations for the seventh poll day.
 9 April: Polling held at 7 parliamentary constituencies spanning over 5 states for the second poll day.
 10 April: Polling held at 92 parliamentary constituencies spanning over 14 states for the third poll day.
 12 April: Issue of notification for the penultimate eighth poll day.
 12 April: Polling held at 5 parliamentary constituencies spanning over 3 states for the fourth poll day.
 17 April: Issue of notification for the last and ultimate ninth poll day.
 17 April: Polling held at 122 parliamentary constituencies spanning over 13 states for the fifth poll day.
 19 April: Last Date for filing nominations for the eighth poll day.
 24 April: Last Date for filing nominations for the ninth poll day.
 24 April: Polling held at 117 parliamentary constituencies spanning over 12 states for the sixth poll day.
 30 April: Polling held at 89 parliamentary constituencies spanning over 9 states for the seventh poll day.
 7 May: Polling held at 64 parliamentary constituencies spanning over 7 states for the eighth poll day.
 12 May: Polling held at 41 parliamentary constituencies spanning over 3 states for the ninth poll day.
 16 May: Counting of votes and declaration of results for all poll days of the election.

Government Formation 
 17 May: PM Manmohan Singh is due to resign after a decade long of service.

References

2014 Indian general election
Political timelines
Indian history timelines